Nicotiana × sanderae is a hybrid of the tobacco species Nicotiana alata and Nicotiana forgetiana. It is the most common Nicotiana variety found and sold in the United Kingdom. Nicotiana × sanderae requires soft soil mixed with sand to thrive. Nicotiana × sanderae is not hardy against frost and will die if it comes in contact with it; however, it withstands drought. Because of its size, N. × sanderae is used as a house or garden plant.

An analytical study published in 1963 concluded that N. × sanderae leaves have a low nicotine concentration and a moderately low nornicotine concentration.

References

sanderae
Hybrid plants
Plants described in 1904
Taxa named by William Watson (botanist)